Robert Duane "Dewey" Halford (March 28, 1919 – October 16, 1994) was an American football coach and college athletic administrator.  He was the head football coach at Morningside College in Sioux City, Iowa, serving for 19 seasons, from 1955 to 1973, and compiling a record of 72–93–3.  Halford was also the athletic director at Morningside from 1969 to 1973 and the commissioner of the North Central Conference (NCC) from 1977 to 1984.

Halford was born on March 28, 1919, in Manning, Iowa. He died on October 16, 1994, at Dickinson Country Memorial Hospital in Spirit Lake, Iowa.

Head coaching record

College

References

1919 births
1994 deaths
American football halfbacks
American football quarterbacks
Morningside Mustangs athletic directors 
Morningside Mustangs football coaches
Morningside Mustangs football players
Morningside Mustangs men's basketball players
North Central Conference commissioners
High school basketball coaches in Iowa
High school football coaches in Iowa
People from Carroll County, Iowa
People from Jefferson, Iowa
Players of American football from Iowa
Basketball players from Iowa